Plainview is an unincorporated community in Meade County, in the U.S. state of South Dakota.

History
Plainview was laid out in 1907, and named for the "plain view" obtained from the elevated town site. A post office called Plainview was established in 1908, and remained in operation until 1972. The community is no longer directly listed on the US Census.

Geography 
Plainview is centered at the intersection of South Dakota Highway 34 and Meade County Highway 39T, locally known as Plainview Road. The community is roughly halfway between Rapid City and Pierre.

Plainview is located in a very rural part of the Great Plains, where only two roads traverse the entire town. The nearest other settlement is fellow unincorporated community Howes, South Dakota, and the closest large settlement is Sturgis. Air transport is also limited; the closest airport with commercial service is Rapid City Regional Airport at 71 miles away.

Climate

According to the Köppen Climate Classification system, Plainview has a cold semi-arid climate, abbreviated "BSk" on climate maps.

Demographics

Political affiliation 
Plainview is located in a staunchly-Republican supporting area, as according to The New York Times and its "Extremely Detailed Map of the 2020 Election", Plainview and neighboring community Howes are part of a precinct where 28 out of a total 33 votes went to GOP incumbent president Donald Trump over Democratic nominee Joe Biden.

References

Unincorporated communities in Meade County, South Dakota
Unincorporated communities in South Dakota